Michael Herzog (27 February 1952 – 30 January 2011) was an Austrian ice hockey player. He competed in the men's tournament at the 1976 Winter Olympics.

References

1952 births
2011 deaths
Austrian ice hockey players
Olympic ice hockey players of Austria
Ice hockey players at the 1976 Winter Olympics
People from Zell am See
Sportspeople from Salzburg (state)